Chervonyi Khutir is a historic neighbourhood in the Darnytskyi District of Kyiv, the capital of Ukraine. It is located between Kharkivske Highway, Kronshtadtska Street, Borova Street, Yalynkova Street, and forest. Most of the buildings are low-rise private homes, while some are industrial enterprises. Chervony Khutir metro station is situated in this neighborhood.

References

External links

 Chervonyi Hutir in Wiki-Encyclopedia Kyiv  

Neighborhoods in Kyiv